Joseph Gion (1826 – January 16, 1889) was an American soldier who fought in the American Civil War. Gion received his country's highest award for bravery during combat, the Medal of Honor. Gion's medal was won for 'securing valuable information' under heavy fire in the Battle of Chancellorsville in Virginia on May 2, 1863. He was honored with the award on November 26, 1884.

Gion was born in Alsace-Lorraine, France. He joined the Army from Pittsburgh in April 1861, and mustered out with his regiment in June 1864. Gion was later buried in Pittsburgh.

Medal of Honor citation

See also
List of American Civil War Medal of Honor recipients: G–L

References

1826 births
1889 deaths
American Civil War recipients of the Medal of Honor
French emigrants to the United States
People from Alsace-Lorraine
People of Pennsylvania in the American Civil War
Union Army soldiers
United States Army Medal of Honor recipients
French-born Medal of Honor recipients